Gaoying is a town of Chang'an District, in the northeast outskirts of Shijiazhuang, Hebei province, China. , it has 6 residential communities under its administration.

See also
List of township-level divisions of Hebei

References

Township-level divisions of Hebei